The 1976 Women's College World Series (WCWS) was held in Omaha, Nebraska on May 13–16, with nineteen college softball teams meeting in the 1976 ASA/AIAW fastpitch softball tournament. Most of the teams had won state championships. This was the last WCWS before the adoption of regional qualifying tournaments. Because college softball had not yet been separated into competitive divisions, large and small colleges competed together in one overall national championship.

Teams
The double-elimination tournament included the following teams:

 Arizona State
 Cal State–Sacramento
 East Stroudsburg State (Pennsylvania)
 Illinois State
 Indiana State
 Kansas
 Mayville State College (North Dakota)
 Michigan State
 Minnesota
 Nebraska–Omaha
 Northern Colorado
 Northern Iowa
 Northern State (South Dakota)
 Northwestern Oklahoma State
 Oregon
 South Carolina
 Tarkio College (Missouri)
 Texas–Arlington
 Utah

The Michigan State Spartans went undefeated through all five of their games to win the 1976 national championship, beating Northern Colorado, 3–0, in the final game. Carol Hutchins played shortstop for that 1976 team and would coach the rival Michigan Wolverines to the WCWS title 29 years later in 2005.

Bracket
The bracket included 19 teams with results as shown.

Ranking

See also

References

Women's College World Series
Women's College World Series
Women's College World Series
Women's College World Series
Women's College World Series
Women's sports in Nebraska